René Clermont (14 November 1921 – 24 October 1994) was a French stage and film actor as well as a playwright.

Theatre

Comedian 
1933: Trois pour 100 by Roger Ferdinand, directed by Gabriel Signoret, Théâtre Antoine as Barbouin
1944: Hyménée by Nikolai Gogol, directed by Pierre Valde, Théâtre du Vieux-Colombier
1947: La terre est ronde by Armand Salacrou, directed by Charles Dullin, Théâtre Sarah-Bernhardt as Giacomo
1949: La Perle de la Canebière by Eugène Labiche and Marc-Michel, directed by André Barsacq, Théâtre de l'Atelier
1949: Robinson by Jules Supervielle, théâtre de verdure de Charbonnières-les-Bains as Robinson
1949: Nuit des hommes by Jean Bernard-Luc, directed by André Barsacq, Théâtre de l'Atelier as Antoine
1950: Le Bal des voleurs by Jean Anouilh, directed by André Barsacq, Théâtre de l'Atelier : Dupont-Dufort fils
1950: L'Enterrement by Henry Monnier, directed by André Barsacq, Théâtre de l'Atelier :  M. Meslin / M. Philibert / M. Poissy / M. Prêcheur / M. Moutardier
1951: Danse sans musique by Henri Charles Richard and Albert Gray after Peter Cheyney, directed by René Clermont, Théâtre des Noctambules as John Episton Pell
1953: Ion by Bernard Zimmer after Euripides, directed by Henri Soubeyran, Théâtre antique de Vaison-la-Romaine as Nicias
1955: Zamore by Georges Neveux, directed by Henri Soubeyran, Théâtre Édouard VII as l'avocat
1955: Le Système deux by Georges Neveux, directed by René Clermont, Théâtre Édouard VII as Henri Charlemagne 2
1956: Le Capitaine Fanfaron by Bernard Zimmer after Plautus, directed by Henri Soubeyran, Théâtre des Mathurins as Palestrion
1960: The Balcony by Jean Genet, directed by Peter Brook, Théâtre du Gymnase as the general
1960: La Voleuse de Londres by Georges Neveux, directed by Raymond Gérôme, Théâtre du Gymnase as Teddy
1961: Coralie et Compagnie by Maurice Hennequin and Albin Valabrègue, directed by Jean Le Poulain, théâtre Sarah-Bernhardt as Étienne
1961: William Conrad by Pierre Boulle, directed by André Charpak, Théâtre Récamier : Wallace Goodfellow
1962: Lieutenant Tenant by Pierre Gripari, directed by Jean-Paul Cisife, Théâtre de la Gaîté-Montparnasse as Popov
1963: La dame ne brûlera pas by Christopher Fry, directed by Pierre Franck, Théâtre de l'Œuvre as the chaplain
1964: Saint Joan by George Bernard Shaw, directed by Pierre Franck, Théâtre Montparnasse : Charles VII
1965: Le Hasard du coin du feu by Crébillon fils, directed by Jean Vilar, Théâtre de l'Athénée as Crébillon
1966: La Fin du monde by Sacha Guitry, directed by Jean-Pierre Delage, Théâtre de la Madeleine as Mgr Le Landier
 1967: Chaud et Froid by Fernand Crommelynck, directed by Pierre Franck, Théâtre de l'Œuvre as the master
 1967: Interdit au public by Jean Marsan, directed by Jean Le Poulain, Théâtre Saint-Georges as Robert Guise
1970: Un piano dans l'herbe by Françoise Sagan, directed by André Barsacq, Théâtre de l'Atelier as Edmond
1973: Les Quatre Vérités by Marcel Aymé, directed by René Clermont, Théâtre des Variétés
1973: Jean de La Fontaine by Sacha Guitry, directed by René Clermont, Théâtre Montparnasse as M. Jannart
1974: La Polka by Patrick Modiano, directed by Jacques Mauclair, Théâtre du Gymnase : Evrard Van Caulaert 
1978: Miam-miam ou le Dîner d'affaires by Jacques Deval, directed by Jean Le Poulain, Théâtre Marigny as le père Tourane
1978: Nina d'André Roussin, directed by Jean-Laurent Cochet, théâtre des Célestins, tournée Herbert-Karsenty

Theatre director 
1951: Danse sans musique by Henri Charles Richard and Albert Gray after Peter Cheyney, Théâtre des Noctambules
1951: La liberté est un dimanche by Pol Quentin, Théâtre Hébertot
1955: Le Système deux by Georges Neveux, Théâtre Édouard VII
1959: Mon ange by Solange Térac, Comédie-Wagram
1971: L'Apollon de Bellac by Jean Giraudoux
1973: Une rose au petit déjeuner by Pierre Barillet and Jean-Pierre Gredy, Théâtre des Bouffes-Parisiens
1973: Jean de La Fontaine by Sacha Guitry, Théâtre Montparnasse
1973: Les Quatre Vérités by Marcel Aymé, Théâtre des Variétés
1974: Les Aventures de Tom Jones by Jean Marsan and Jacques Debronckart after Henry Fielding, Théâtre de Paris
1975: La Libellule and Aldo Nicolaï, Théâtre des Nouveautés
1975: La Balance by Claude Reichman, Théâtre Fontaine
1976: La Frousse by Julien Vartet, Studio des Champs-Elysées
1981: Le Charimari by Pierrette Bruno, Théâtre Saint-Georges
1982: Azaïs by Georges Berr and Louis Verneuil, Eldorado
1984: Treize à table by Marc-Gilbert Sauvajon, Théâtre Édouard VII
1985: La Berlue by Jean-Jacques Bricaire and Maurice Lasaygues, Petit Marigny then tournée Herbert-Karsenty
1986: Gog et Magog by Roger MacDougall and Ted Allan, tournée Herbert-Karsenty
1987: La Menteuse by Jean-Jacques Bricaire and Maurice Lasaygues, Théâtre Marigny
1992: George et Margaret by Marc-Gilbert Sauvajon and Jean Wall, Théâtre des Bouffes-Parisiens

Filmography

Cinema 

1945: Les Cadets de l'océan (by Jean Dréville) - Le Dréan
1946: Les Démons de l'aube (by Yves Allégret) - Un des commandos
1949: Docteur Laennec (by Maurice Cloche) - Le mime
1951: Without Leaving an Address (by Jean-Paul Le Chanois) - Un journaliste (uncredited)
1951: The Beautiful Image (by Claude Heymann) - L'homme aux cochons d'Inde
1952: Le Crime du Bouif (by André Cerf)
1952: La Forêt de l'adieu (by Ralph Habib) - Le notaire
1952: Adieu Paris (by Claude Heymann) - Boireau
1953: Puccini (Puccini, viste d'arte, vissi d'amore) (by Carmine Gallone and Glauco Pellegrini) - Illica
1954: Leguignon guérisseur (by  Maurice Labro)
1955: Classes élémentaires (Scuola elementare) (by Alberto Lattuada) - Vincenzo Serafini
1955: Magic Village (by Jean-Paul Le Chanois) - L'homme chiffres
1955: Vous pigez ? (by Pierre Chevalier) - Romano
1956: La Foire aux femmes (by Jean Stelli) - Gros-Jésus
1956: Alerte au deuxième bureau (by Jean Stelli)
1957: Le Grand Bluff (by Patrice Dally) - Un inventeur
1957: La Peau de l'ours (by Claude Boissol) - Le directeur du labo
1958: Police judiciaire (by Maurice de Canonge) - Un inspecteur (uncredited)
1960: La Dragée haute (by Jean Kerchner)
1961: Napoleon II, the Eagle (by Claude Boissol)
1962: Le Diable et les Dix Commandements (by Julien Duvivier, sketch : Un seul dieu tu adoreras) - Le père / The father (segment "Un seul Dieu tu adoreras")
1962: Sundays and Cybele (by Serge Bourguignon) - Le facteur
1963: Carom Shots (by Marcel Bluwal) - Frépillon
1966: Who Are You, Polly Maggoo? (by William Klein) - Le producteur
1968: Salut Berthe (by Guy Lefranc) - Le commissaire
1970: Promise at Dawn (by Jules Dassin) - Mr. Piekielny
1970: L'Âne de Zigliara or Une drôle de bourrique (by Jean Canolle)
1971: Laisse aller... c'est une valse (by Georges Lautner) - Le divisionnaire
1971: La Coqueluche (by Christian-Paul Arrighi)
1972: La Nuit bulgare (by Michel Mitrani) - Desnoye
1972: Paulina 1980 (by Jean-Louis Bertucelli) - Le père Bubbo / Uncle Bubbo
1973: L'accalmie (by Alain Magrou)
1981: La Puce et le Privé (by Roger Kay) - Le notaire
1984: Fort Saganne (by Alain Corneau) - Monsieur de Saint-Ilette

Television

Comedian 
1962: L'inspecteur Leclerc enquête (Episode: Les Blousons gris, by Marcel Bluwal) - L'éditeur
1964: Rocambole (by Jean-Pierre Decourt: M. de Beaupréau.) - Beaupréau (1964-1965)
1965-1966: Les Cinq Dernières Minutes (Episode: Napoléon est mort à Saint-Mandé, by Claude Loursais) - Prosper / Langlade
1966: Le Chevalier d'Harmental (by Jean-Pierre Decourt) - Buvat
1966: Les Cinq Dernières Minutes (Episode: La Rose de fer, by Jean-Pierre Marchand)
1966: La chasse au météore (TV Movie, by Roger Iglesis) - judge Proth 
1968: L'Homme de l'ombre (Episode: L'Aventure, by Guy Jorré) - Le policier privé
1970: Reportage sur un squelette ou Masques et bergamasques (by Michel Mitrani) - le monsieur
1972: Les Évasions célèbres (Episode: Latude ou l'Entêtement de vivre, by Jean-Pierre Decourt) - Cochard
1977: La Famille Cigale' '- Fabien Damien-Lacour
1977: Richelieu ou le Cardinal de Velours (by Jean-Pierre Decourt) - Desbournais
1977: Le Loup blanc (TV Movie, by Jean-Pierre Decourt) - Le Courtaud

 
Comedian
1966: Interdit au public by Roger Dornès and Jean Marsan, directed by Jean Le Poulain, TV director Pierre Sabbagh, Théâtre Marigny
1968: Le Système Deux by Georges Neveux, directed by René Clermont, TV director Pierre Sabbagh, Théâtre Marigny
1970: Et l'enfer Isabelle ? by Jacques Deval, directed by Jacques Mauclair, TV director Pierre Sabbagh, Théâtre Marigny
1978: Miam-miam ou le Dîner d'affaires by Jacques Deval, directed by Jean Le Poulain, TV director Pierre Sabbagh, Théâtre Marigny
1980: Danse sans musique by Richard Puydorat and Albert Gray after Peter Cheyney, directed by René Clermont, TV director Pierre Sabbagh, Théâtre Marigny

Theatre director 
1968: Le Système Deux by Georges Neveux, TV director Pierre Sabbagh, Théâtre Marigny
1971: La lune est bleue by Hugh Herbert, adaptation Jean Bernard-Luc, TV director Pierre Sabbagh, Théâtre Marigny
1972: Adorable Julia by Marc-Gilbert Sauvajon, TV director Georges Folgoas, Théâtre Marigny
1973: Les Quatre Vérités by Marcel Aymé, TV director Georges Folgoas, Théâtre Marigny
1973: Le Complexe de Philémon by Jean Bernard-Luc, TV director Georges Folgoas, Théâtre Marigny
1974: Nick Carter détéctive by Jean Marcillac, TV director Georges Folgoas, Théâtre Marigny
1974: La Parisienne by Henry Becque, TV director Georges Folgoas, Théâtre Marigny
1974: Hélène ou la Joie de vivre by André Roussin and Madeleine Gray after John Erskine's novel, TV director Georges Folgoas, Théâtre Édouard VII
1974: Pluie after Somerset Maugham, TV director Georges Folgoas, Théâtre Édouard VII
1975: Le Pape kidnappé by João Bethencourt, adaptation André Roussin, TV director Pierre Sabbagh, Théâtre Édouard VII
1975: Les Hannetons by Eugène Brieux, TV director Pierre Sabbagh, Théâtre Édouard VII
1976: L'Héritière by Ruth Goetz and Augustus Goetz, TV director Pierre Sabbagh, Théâtre Édouard VII
1976: La Frousse by Julien Vartet, TV director Pierre Sabbagh, Théâtre Édouard VII
1977 : La Libellule by Aldo Nicolaj, TV director Pierre Sabbagh, Théâtre Marigny
1977: L'Archipel Lenoir by Armand Salacrou, TV director Pierre Sabbagh, Théâtre Marigny
1977: La Balance by Claude Reichman, TV director Pierre Sabbagh, Théâtre Marigny
1977: Caterina by Félicien Marceau, TV director Pierre Sabbagh, Théâtre Marigny
1978: Quadrille by Sacha Guitry, TV director Pierre Sabbagh, Théâtre Marigny
1979: Miss Mabel by Robert Cedric Sherriff, TV director Pierre Sabbagh, Théâtre Marigny
1979: La Gueule du loup by Stephen Wendt, adaptation Marc-Gilbert Sauvajon, TV director Pierre Sabbagh, Théâtre Marigny
1980: Une rose au petit déjeuner by Pierre Barillet and Jean-Pierre Gredy, TV director Pierre Sabbagh, Théâtre Marigny
1980: Danse sans musique by Richard Puydorat and Albert Gray after Peter Cheyney, TV director Pierre Sabbagh, Théâtre Marigny

 TV director 
1980: La Vie des autres, épisode Demain je me marie''

Bibliography

External links 
 
 René Clermont on UniFrance
 Les Gens du cinéma
 Les Archives du spectacle

People from Dakar
1921 births
1994 deaths
20th-century French dramatists and playwrights
French male stage actors
20th-century French male actors
French expatriates in Senegal